Chapsa rubropulveracea is a species of corticolous lichen in the family Graphidaceae. It is characterized by its transversely septate, translucent ascospores and pigmented apothecial discs. Found in Dominica, it was described as new to science in 2011 by Armin Mangold, Robert Lücking and H. Thorsten Lumbsch. The original specimen was collected by Mason Hale, who intended for it to be placed in the genus Thelotrema, but it was never published. The species epithet rubropulveracea refers to the red-pruinose apothecial disc.

References

Ostropales
Lichen species
Lichens described in 2011
Lichens of the Caribbean
Taxa named by Helge Thorsten Lumbsch
Taxa named by Robert Lücking